Richard Nikolaus Eijiro, Count of Coudenhove-Kalergi (16 November 1894 – 27 July 1972) was an Austrian-Japanese politician, philosopher and Count of Coudenhove-Kalergi. A pioneer of European integration, he served as the founding president of the Paneuropean Union for 49 years. His parents were Heinrich von Coudenhove-Kalergi, an Austro-Hungarian diplomat, and Mitsuko Aoyama, the daughter of an oil merchant, antiques-dealer and major landowner in Tokyo. His childhood name in Japan was Aoyama Eijiro. Being a native Austrian-Hungarian citizen, he became a Czechoslovak citizen in 1919 and then took French citizenship from 1939 until his death.

His first book, Pan-Europa, was published in 1923 and contained a membership form for the Pan-Europa movement, which held its first Congress in 1926 in Vienna. In 1927, Aristide Briand was elected honorary president of the Pan-Europa movement. Public figures who attended Pan-Europa congresses included Albert Einstein, Thomas Mann and Sigmund Freud.

Coudenhove-Kalergi was the first recipient of the Charlemagne Prize in 1950. The 1972–1973 academic year at the College of Europe was named in his honour. Coudenhove-Kalergi proposed Beethoven's "Ode to Joy" as the music for the European Anthem. He also proposed a Europe Day, a European postage stamp, and many artifacts for the movement (e.g. badges and pennants).

Family roots 

Coudenhove-Kalergi was the second son of Heinrich von Coudenhove-Kalergi (1859–1906), an Austro-Hungarian count and diplomat. His mother was Mitsuko Aoyama (1874–1941). His father, who spoke sixteen languages and embraced travel as the only means of prolonging life yet died in his forties, had prematurely abandoned a career in the Austrian diplomatic service that took him to Athens, Constantinople, Rio de Janeiro and Tokyo, to devote himself to study and writing.

Coudenhove-Kalergi's parents met when his mother helped the Austro-Hungarian diplomat after he fell off a horse while riding in Japan. In commenting on their union, Whittaker Chambers described the future originator of Pan-Europe as "practically a Pan-European organization himself." He elaborated: "The Coudenhoves were a wealthy Flemish family that fled to Austria during the French Revolution. The Kalergis were a wealthy Greek family from Crete. The line has been further crossed with Poles, Norwegians, Balts, French and Germans, but since the families were selective as well as cosmopolitan, the hybridization has been consistently successful." The Kalergis family roots claim their descent from Byzantine royalty via Venetian aristocracy, connecting with the Phokas imperial dynasty. In 1300, Coudenhove-Kalergi's ancestor Alexios Phokas-Kalergis signed the treaty that made Crete a dominion of Venice.

During his childhood, Coudenhove-Kalergi's mother had read aloud to him Momotarō and other Japanese fairy tales.

Youth and education 

Coudenhove-Kalergi spent his adolescence on Bohemian family estates in Ronsperg, known today as Poběžovice. His father personally taught his two sons Russian and Hungarian and toughened them both physically and morally. He took them on long walks in all weather, made them sleep on straw mattresses and take cold showers, and taught them to shoot and fence so well that no one would ever dare challenge them. He also took them to mass every Sunday. On every Good Friday, as the liturgy came to the exhortation "oremus et pro perfidis Judaeis" ("Let us also pray for the perfidious Jews"), the old count allegedly rose and walked out of the church in a protest against this supposed expression of antisemitism.

Coudenhove-Kalergi studied at the Augustiner-Gymnasium in Brixen before attending the Theresianische Akademie in Vienna from 1908 until 1913. He obtained his doctorate in philosophy with a thesis on Die Objectivität als Grundprinzip der Moral (Objectivity as the Fundamental Principle of Morals) in 1917 from the University of Vienna.

During his student years, Coudenhove-Kalergi married the famous Jewish Viennese actress Ida Roland in April 1915. His marriage to a divorcée thirteen years his senior, and a commoner, caused a temporary split with his family. His mother Mitsuko did not accept Ida, considering her a "beggar living on the riverbank," a traditional Japanese point of view against actors and performers. His mother, as head of the family, banned him from the family temporarily, but relented when Coudenhove-Kalergi became renowned for his pan-European concept.

Personal philosophy 
Aristocratic in his origins and elitist in his ideas, Coudenhove-Kalergi identified and collaborated with such politicians as Engelbert Dollfuss, Kurt Schuschnigg, Otto von Habsburg, Winston Churchill, and Charles de Gaulle. His ideal political constituent was a gentleman who must respect and protect ladies, a person adhering to honesty, fair play, courtesy, and rational discourse. He strove to replace the nationalist German ideal of racial community with the goal of an ethnically heterogeneous European nation based on a commonality of culture, a nation whose geniuses were the "great Europeans" such as abbé de Saint-Pierre, Kant, Napoleon, Giuseppe Mazzini, Victor Hugo, and Friedrich Nietzsche.

Pan-European political activist 

Coudenhove-Kalergi is recognized as the founder of the first popular movement for a united Europe. His intellectual influences ranged from Immanuel Kant, Rudolf Kjellén and Oswald Spengler to Arthur Schopenhauer and Friedrich Nietzsche. In politics, he was an enthusiastic supporter of "fourteen points" made by Woodrow Wilson on 8 January 1918 and pacifist initiatives of Kurt Hiller. In December 1921, he joined the Masonic lodge "Humanitas" in Vienna. In 1922, he co-founded the Pan-European Union (PEU) with Archduke Otto von Habsburg, as "the only way of guarding against an eventual world hegemony by Russia." In 1923, he published a manifesto entitled Pan-Europa, each copy containing a membership form which invited the reader to become a member of the Pan-Europa movement. He favored social democracy as an improvement on "the feudal aristocracy of the sword" but his ambition was to create a conservative society that superseded democracy with "the social aristocracy of the spirit." European freemason lodges supported his movement, including the lodge Humanitas. Pan-Europa was translated into the languages of European countries (excluding Italian, which edition was not published at that time), the constructed language Occidental and a multitude of other languages, except for Russian.

In April 1924, Coudenhove-Kalergi founded the journal Paneuropa (1924–1938) of which he was editor and principal author. The next year he started publishing his main work, the Kampf um Paneuropa  (The fight for Paneuropa, 1925–1928, three volumes). In 1926, the first Congress of the Pan-European Union was held in Vienna and the 2,000 delegates elected Coudenhove-Kalergi as president of the Central Council, a position he held until his death in 1972.

His original vision was for a world divided into only five states: a United States of Europe that would link continental countries with French and Italian possessions in Africa; a Pan-American Union encompassing North and South Americas; the British Commonwealth circling the globe; the USSR spanning Eurasia; and a Pan-Asian Union whereby Japan and China would control most of the Pacific. To him, the only hope for a Europe devastated by war was to federate along lines that the Hungarian-born Romanian Aurel Popovici and others had proposed for the dissolved multinational Empire of Austria-Hungary. According to Coudenhove-Kalergi, Pan-Europe would encompass and extend a more flexible and more competitive Austria-Hungary, with English serving as the world language, spoken by everyone in addition to their native tongue. He believed that individualism and socialism would learn to cooperate instead of compete, and urged that capitalism and communism cross-fertilise each other just as the Protestant Reformation had spurred the Catholic Church to regenerate itself.

Coudenhove-Kalergi attempted to enlist prominent European politicians in his pan-European cause. He offered the presidency of the Austrian branch of the Pan-European Union to Ignaz Seipel, who accepted the offer unhesitatingly and rewarded his beneficiary with an office in the old Imperial palace in Vienna. Coudenhove-Kalergi had less success with Tomáš Masaryk, who referred him to his uncooperative Prime Minister Edvard Beneš. However, the idea of pan-Europe elicited support from politicians as diverse as the Italian anti-Fascist politician Carlo Sforza and the German President of the Reichsbank under Hitler, Hjalmar Schacht. Although Coudenhove-Kalergi found himself unable to sway Benito Mussolini, his ideas influenced Aristide Briand through his speech in favour of a European Union in the League of Nations on 8 September 1929, as well as his famous 1930 "Memorandum on the Organisation of a Regime of European Federal Union."

Coudenhove-Kalergi proposed Beethoven's "Ode to Joy" as the Anthem of Europe in 1929, which he later proposed in 1955 as Anthem for the European Union. In 1930, he proposed a Europe Day in May and in 1932 he proposed to celebrate every 17 May, the anniversary of Aristide Briand's "Memorandum" being published in 1930. However, his Pan-Europeanism earned vivid loathing from Adolf Hitler, who excoriated its pacifism and mechanical economism and belittled its founder as "a bastard." Hitler's view of Coudenhove-Kalergi was that the "rootless, cosmopolitan, and elitist half-breed" was going to repeat the historical mistakes of Coudenhove ancestors who had served the House of Habsburg. In 1928, Hitler wrote about his political opponent in his Zweites Buch, describing him as "".

Hitler did not share the ideas of his Austrian compatriot. He argued in his 1928 Secret Book that they are unfit for the future defense of Europe against America. As America fills its North American lebensraum, "the natural activist urge that is peculiar to young nations will turn outward." But then "a pacifist-democratic Pan-European hodgepodge state" would not be able to oppose the United States, as it is "according to the conception of that commonplace bastard, Coudenhove-Kalergi..." Nazi criticism and propaganda against Coudenhove-Kalergi, and his European worldview, would decades later form the basis of the racist Kalergi plan conspiracy theory.

Nazis considered the Pan-European Union to be under the control of Freemasonry. In 1938, a Nazi propaganda book  was released in German. It revealed Coudenhove-Kalergi's membership of Freemasonry, the organization suppressed by Nazis. On the other hand, his name was not to be found in Masonic directories 10,000 Famous Freemasons published in 1957–1960 by the United States' freemasons. He had already left the Viennese Masonic Lodge in 1926 to avoid the criticism that had occurred at that time against the relationship between the Pan-European movement and Freemasonry. He wrote about his Masonic membership in Ein Leben für Europa (A Life for Europe) published in 1966. In fact, its Nazi propaganda book also described his action in 1924–1925 only. However, this propaganda also stated that "The Grand Lodge of Wien went enthusiastically to work for the Pan European Union in a call to all Masonic chief authorities. Even the Masonic newspaper The Beacon enthused about the thoughts of the higher degree Freemason Coudenhove-Kalergi, and stated in March 1925:
"Freemasonry, especially Austrian Freemasonry, may be eminently satisfied to have Coudenhove-Kalergi among its members. Austrian Freemasonry can rightly report that Brother Coudenhove-Kalergi fights for his Pan European beliefs: political honesty, social insight, the struggle against lies, striving for the recognition and cooperation of all those of good will. In this higher sense, Brother Coudenhove-Kalergi's program is a Masonic work of the highest order, and to be able to work on it together is a lofty task for all brother Masons.""

After the annexation of Austria by Nazi Germany in 1938, Coudenhove-Kalergi fled to Czechoslovakia, and thence to France. As France fell to Germany in 1940, he escaped to the United States by way of Switzerland and Portugal. When he passed a few days after the successful escape to the United States, he listened to the radio announcing the possibility that he had died. During World War II, he continued his call for the unification of Europe along the Paris-London axis. His wartime politics and adventures served as the real life basis for fictional Resistance hero Victor Laszlo, the Paul Henreid character in Casablanca. 

Coudenhove-Kalergi published his work Crusade for Paneurope in 1944. His appeal for the unification of Europe enjoyed some support from Winston Churchill, Allen Dulles, and "Wild Bill" Donovan. After the announcement of the Atlantic Charter on 14 August 1941, he composed a memorandum entitled "Austria's Independence in the light of the Atlantic Charter" and sent it to Winston Churchill and Franklin Delano Roosevelt. In his position statement, Coudenhove-Kalergi took up the goals of the charter and recommended himself as head of government in exile. Both Churchill and Roosevelt distanced themselves from this document. From 1942 until his return to France in 1945, he taught at the New York University, which appointed him professor of history in 1944. At the same university Professor Ludwig von Mises studied currency problems for Coudenhove-Kalergi's movement.

On 22 July 1943, Nazis deprived him of his Doctor of Philosophy degree from the University of Vienna, with the racist argument, that as a "Jew" he was not considered dignified an academic degree of a German university ("eines akademischen Grades einer deutschen Hochschule unwürdig") – even though he was not Jewish nor was his family Jewish. His doctorate degree was only regranted on 15 May 1955, six years after the founding of the Federal Republic of Germany and thus ten years after the end of Nazism.

The end of the World War II inaugurated a revival of pan-European hopes. In the winter of 1945, Harry S. Truman read an article in the December issue of Collier's magazine that Coudenhove-Kalergi posted about the integration of Europe. His article impressed Truman, and it was adopted to the United States' official policy. Winston Churchill's celebrated speech of 19 September 1946 to the Academic Youth in Zurich commended "the exertions of the Pan-European Union which owes so much to Count Coudenhove-Kalergi and which commanded the services of the famous French patriot and statesman Aristide Briand." In November 1946 and the spring of 1947, Coudenhove-Kalergi circulated an enquiry addressed to members of European parliaments. This enquiry resulted in the founding of the European Parliamentary Union (EPU), a nominally private organization that held its preliminary conference on 4–5 July at Gstaad, Switzerland, and followed it with its first full conference from 8 to 12 September. Speaking at the first EPU conference, Coudenhove-Kalergi argued that the constitution of a wide market with a stable currency was the vehicle for Europe to reconstruct its potential and take the place it deserves within the concert of Nations. On less guarded occasions he was heard to advocate a revival of Charlemagne's empire. In 1950 he received the first annual Karlspreis (Charlemagne Award), given by the German city of Aachen to people who contributed to the European idea and European peace. In Japan, a politician Ichirō Hatoyama was influenced by Coudenhove-Kalergi's fraternity in his book The Totalitarian State Against Man. It was translated into Japanese by Hatoyama and published in 1952. Coudenhove-Kalergi was appointed the honorary chairman of the fraternal youth association that Hatoyama, with the influence of his book, had established in 1953.

In 1955, he proposed the Beethoven's "Ode to Joy" as the music for the European Anthem, a suggestion that the Council of Europe took up 16 years later.

In the 1960s, Coudenhove-Kalergi urged Austria to pursue "an active policy of peace", as a "fight against the Cold War and its continuation, the atomic war". He advocated Austrian involvement in world politics in order to keep the peace, as "active neutrality". He continued his advocacy of European unification in memoranda circulated to the governments of the Federal Republic of Germany, France, the United Kingdom, and Italy. He recommended negotiations between the European Community and the European Free Trade Association towards forming a "European customs union" that would be free of political and military connections, but would eventually adopt a monetary union.

Views on race and religion 
In his 1925 book Practical Idealism, Coudenhove-Kalergi envisioned an all-encompassing race of the future made up of "Eurasian-Negroid[s]", replacing "the diversity of peoples" and "[t]oday's races and classes" with a "diversity of individuals".

In an interview in the first Pan-European Congress in 1926, he expressed the support of Jews by the pan-European movement and the benefits to Jews with the elimination of racial hatred and economic rivalry brought by the United States of Europe. In 1932, Coudenhove-Kalergi composed, and had his publishing house reissue, a preface for a new edition of his father Heinrich von Coudenhove-Kalergi's condemnation of antisemitism in his later life. In 1933, he responded to the ascendance of Nazism by collaborating with Heinrich Mann, Arthur Holitscher, Lion Feuchtwanger, and Max Brod in writing and publishing the pamphlet Gegen die Phrase vom jüdischen Schädling ("Against the Phrase 'Jewish Parasite'").

Journeys to Japan

Return to Japan 
The Pan-European idea influenced a young Japanese diplomat – in the future, the president of Kajima Corporation – Morinosuke Kajima during his residence in Berlin in 1922. Coudenhove-Kalergi formed a friendship with Kajima and then asked him to translate the book Pan-Europa into Japanese. He proposed Pan-Asia to Kajima and promised to give Dutch East Indies as their friendship after the realization of the task to establish Pan-Asia. Kajima published Pan-Europa in Japanese in 1927. In 1930 Kajima retired from the Ministry of Foreign Affairs to become MP. His ambition to become an MP was due to Coudenhove-Kalergi's influence. In 1970–1971 he published the complete works of Coudenhove-Kalergi from Kajima Institute Publishing that was established by Morinosuke Kajima. He respected Coudenhove-Kalergi over a lifetime, dreaming of the realization of Pan-Asia.

In Japan, the Pan-European idea also influenced a journalist Yoshinori Maeda, the president of NHK. He became a pioneer of Asia-Pacific Broadcasting Union with the image of Pan-Europa that he read in his student days.

In 1953 Ichirō Hatoyama established Yuai Youth Association (later Yuai Association), the fraternal association as the successor of fraternity that Coudenhove-Kalergi mentioned in The Totalitarian State Against Man. The Japanese word  has several meanings but especially the word used by Hatoyama means fraternity and in German brüderlichkeit. It can also be considered equivalent to "Liberty, Equality, Fraternity" (Brotherhood), the motto of the French Republic. An educator Kaoru Hatoyama became the second president of the association after her husband Ichirō, the first president, died in 1959.

In 1967 Coudenhove-Kalergi was awarded the Kajima Peace Award, and was invited to Japan by Morinosuke Kajima as the president of Kajima Institute of International Peace, Yoshinori Maeda as the president of NHK, and Kaoru Hatoyama as the president of Yuai Youth Association. Together with his second wife Alexandra in a wheelchair, Coudenhove-Kalergi stayed in Japan from 26 October to 8 November. He was also accompanied by his young brother Gerolf's daughter Barbara. Richard Coudenhove-Kalergi was also awarded First Order of the Sacred Treasure of Japan. He was granted an audience with the Emperor Hirohito, Empress Kōjun, their son Crown Prince Akihito to whom he had presented his book in 1953 in Switzerland, and Crown Princess Michiko. This time, he had returned to Japan for the first time since his childhood 71 years earlier. He gave several lectures and met various leaders. Coudenhove-Kalergi spent 2 weeks in Japan as a guest of Japanese TV, radio, newspaper, magazines and other media. While in Japan, Coudenhove-Kalergi specifically asked for a meeting with the president of Soka Gakkai, Dr. Daisaku Ikeda, as Coudenhove-Kalergi had been interested in Ikeda's work for many years. After their first meeting in October 1967, Coudenhove-Kalergi described Ikeda as "very energetic, life-loving, honorable, friendly and intelligent."

Soka Gakkai invitation 
Coudenhove-Kalergi visited Japan again at the invitation of the Soka Gakkai in October 1970. During his stay, he and Daisaku Ikeda conducted a formal dialogue over the course of several days, a total of more than 12 hours of which was recorded for posterity. He also visited the campus of Soka University in Tokyo, which was under construction at that time.

Two decades later, in 1990, Ikeda proposed that Coudenhove-Kalergi's favorite song, Beethoven's "Ode to Joy," be regularly performed at major Soka Gakkai meetings. It was reported in Japan that this was one cause of the split between the Soka Gakkai and Soka Gakkai International (SGI) from Nichiren Shoshu in 1991, as the Nichiren Shoshu priesthood objected to the song's "Christian origins."

Death 

According to a masonic report, Coudenhove-Kalergi died of a stroke. His secretary, however, indicated that Coudenhove-Kalergi possibly committed suicide. In the memoir his secretary wrote, she said his death had been kept secret so as not to disappoint those who considered him to be the great visionary of European integration. Coudenhove-Kalergi was the head of the Pan-European Union until his death. The presidency was succeeded by Otto von Habsburg.

Coudenhove-Kalergi is buried at Gruben near Gstaad. His grave, covered with wild grapes, is located in a Japanese rock garden in the Swiss Alps. Upon the grave is the French epitaph "" (Pioneer of the United States of Europe).

Coudenhove-Kalergi was married three times: to Ida Roland (1881–1951), to Alexandra Gräfin von Tiele-Winckler (1896–1968), and to Melanie Benatzky-Hoffmann (1909–1983). His known children were Ida's daughter Erika and Alexandra's son Alexander, both of whom were his step-children.

Publications 
 Adel (1922)
 Ethik und Hyperethik (1922); Héros ou Saint (1929), the Cahiers Internationaux series of the publisher Les Editions Rieder, 7, Place Saint-Sulpice, Paris, translated from German into French by Marcel Beaufils
 Pan-Europa (1923), Paneuropa Verlag; Pan-Europe (1926), Knopf, abridged, with an introduction by Nicholas Murray Butler
 Krise der Weltanschauung (1923)
 Pazifismus (1924)
 Deutschlands Europäische Sendung. Ein Gespräch (1924)
 Praktischer Idealismus (1925). English translation.
 Kampf um Paneuropa (3 Volumes, 1925–28)
 Held oder Heiliger (1927)
 Brüning – Hitler: Revision der Bündnispolitik (1931), Paneuropa-Verlag
 Stalin & Co. (1931)
 Gebote des Lebens (1931)
 Los vom Materialismus! (1931)
 La lutte pour l'Europe (1931)
 Revolution durch Technik (1932)
 Gegen die Phrase vom jüdischen Schädling (1933), co-authored with Heinrich Mann, Arthur Holitscher, Lion Feuchtwanger, and Max Brod
 Europa erwacht! (1934)
 Judenhaß von heute: Graf H. Coudenhofe-Kalergi. Das Wesen des Antisemitismus (1935)
 Europa ohne Elend: Ausgewählte Reden (1936)
 Judenhaß! (1937)
 Totaler Staat – Totaler Mensch (1937), Paneuropa Verlag; Totaler Mensch – Totaler Staat (1939), Herold Verlag; Totaler Mensch – Totaler Staat (1965), Herold Verlag
 The Totalitarian State Against Man, with an introduction by Wickham Steed, translated by Sir Andrew Mc Fadyean (1938), London, Frederick Muller Ltd.
 Europe Must Unite, translated by Sir Andrew Mc Fadyean (1939)
 Die europäische Mission der Frau (1940)
 Crusade for Pan-Europe (1943)
 Kampf um Europa (1949)
 Ida Roland: In Memoriam (1951)
 Die Europäische Nation (1953)
 Der Gentleman (1953)
 An Idea Conquers the World, with a preface by Winston S. Churchill (1953)
 Vom Ewigen Krieg zum Großen Frieden (1956)
 Eine Idee erobert Europa (1958)
 From War to Peace (1959)
 Ein Leben für Europa (1966)
 Für die Revolution der Brüderlichkeit (1968), Zurich, Verlag Die Waage
 , translated into Japanese by Morinosuke Kajima (1968), Tokyo, Kajima Institute Publishing
 Weltmacht Europa (1971)
 , interview collection with Daisaku Ikeda (1972), Tokyo, publication branch of Sankei Shimbun Co., Ltd.

Awards and honors 
 1950: Charlemagne Prize
 1954: Officer of the Legion of Honour
 1962: Grand Decoration of Honour in Silver with Star of the Republic of Austria
 1965: Sonning Prize
 1966: 
 1967: Order of the Sacred Treasure, 1st class of Japan
 1967: Kajima Peace Award
 1972: Konrad Adenauer Prize
 1972: Knight Commander's Cross of the Federal Republic of Germany
 Dr. h. c. of Nihon University
 
 Nobel Peace Prize nominee in 59 nominations, known by 1971 so far. 1972 is still concealed.

See also 
 Federal Europe
 Ideas of European unity before 1945
 Pan-European nationalism
 Founding fathers of the European Union
 Kalergi Plan

References

Notes

Sources 

 
 
 
 
 
 
 
 
 
 
 
 
 
 
 
 
 
 
 
 
 
  (with an introduction by Reinhard Heydrich)
  (with an introduction by Harry S. Truman)
 
  The role of Count Coudenhove-Kalergi in east central European federalism is reexamined.
 
 
 
 
 
 
 
 
 
  (New York: Roy Publishers)

External links 

 International Paneuropean Union
 European Society Coudenhove-Kalergi
 Archival sources on the Paneuropean Union and the European Parliamentary Union at the Historical Archives of the EU in Florence
 
 Recordings of interviews and speeches with Richard Coudenhove-Kalergi in the Online Archive of the Österreichische Mediathek (in German). Retrieved 29 July 2019

 
1894 births
1972 deaths
Austrian politicians
Austrian politicians of Japanese descent
Austrian people of Polish descent
Austrian people of Greek descent
European integration pioneers
Richard
Richard
Officiers of the Légion d'honneur
Recipients of the Order of the Sacred Treasure, 1st class
Knights Commander of the Order of Merit of the Federal Republic of Germany
Counts of Austria
Geopoliticians
University of Vienna alumni
New York University faculty
European Union diplomats
Pan-Europeanism
History of the European Union
People from Tokyo
Deaths in Austria
Burials in Switzerland
Austrian Freemasons
Austrian officials of the European Union
Austrian anti-communists
20th-century Austrian philosophers
Eurofederalism